Sir David Hoare, 9th Baronet (born 1935) is a British banker. He served as the chairman of C. Hoare & Co from 2001 to 2006.

Life and career
Hoare was born in 1935 and was educated at Eton College. He did his national service in the British Army in 1954. He then spent two years in Australia and New Zealand, and he worked as a banker in South Africa.

In 1959, he joined the family bank, C. Hoare & Co. He served as a managing partner from 1964 to 1988, as its deputy chairman from 1988 to 2001, and as its chairman from 2001 to 2006. He serves on its board of directors.

Personal life

He inherited Luscombe Castle in Devon. He is a member of White's, a private members' club in London, and the Royal St George's Golf Club, a golf club in Sandwich, Kent.

He has a son, Simon.

References

Living people
1935 births
Bankers from London
People educated at Eton College
British corporate directors
Baronets in the Baronetage of Great Britain
David